For the town located in Sagar district of Madhya Pradesh, please see Sumer, Sagar.

Sumer is a town in Vidisha district of Madhya Pradesh.

Cities and towns in Vidisha district